Nitya Chaitanya Yati (2 November 1924 – 14 May 1999) was an Indian philosopher, psychologist, author and poet, best known for his commentaries on Advaita Vedanta as well as his literary criticisms. He was a disciple of Nataraja Guru, the successor to Narayana Guru. Yati published over 140 books in English and Malayalam including a commentary on Darsana Mala of Narayana Guru, titled, Psychology of Darsana Mala. Kerala Sahitya Akademi honoured him with their annual award for literary criticism in 1977.

Biography
Nitya Chaitanya Yati was born K. R. Jayachandra Panicker on 2 November 1924 at Vakayar, a village in the erstwhile Travancore, now in Pathanamthitta district of the south Indian state of Kerala to Pandalam Raghava Panicker, a poet, teacher , and his wife, Vamakshi Amma and nephew of Muloor S. Padmanabha Panicker. After early education by a local teacher by name, Nanu Pillai, he studied at Kulathingal High School from where he passed the SSLC examination. Subsequently, he left home and traveled for the next eight years during which period he learnt Buddhism, Jainism and Sufism and met such people as Mahatma Gandhi and Ramana Maharshi. On his return from his wanderings, he joined Union Christian College, Aluva and earned his graduate degree in philosophy before securing a master's degree in philosophy from the University College, Thiruvananthapuram in 1952.

Yati was influenced by Ramana Maharshi after his meeting with the spiritual leader and he took up sanyasa in 1951. After serving as a faculty at the Sree Narayana College, Kollam for a while, he moved to Mumbai to research on the physically challenged until his move to Chennai to teach at Ramakrishna Mission Vivekananda College in 1953. He stayed in Chennai till 1955 and returned to Mumbai for further research work before moving to New Delhi in 1963 to join the Institute of Psychiatric and Spiritual Research as its director. Later, he succeeded Nataraja Guru as head of the Narayana Gurukulam, a worldwide contemplative community, after a long apprenticeship. In between, he was also associated with the Indian Council of Medical Research as the head of the division of Yoga and with the East West University, of which he was the founder chairperson.

Nitya Chaitanya Yati died on 14 May 1999, at Fernhill Gurukula of Narayana Gurukula, near Ooty, at the age of 74.

Legacy 
Nitya Chaitanya Yati authored over 140 books of which 120 are in Malayalam and the rest in English, covering such topics as philosophy, psychology, social ethics and aesthetics and was involved with the World Government of World Citizens as a committed sponsor. Nalini Enna Kavyashilpam (Nalini, a poetic sculpture)), his critical study of the Kumaran Asan's poem, Nalini, fetched him the Kerala Sahitya Akademi Award for Literary Criticism in 1977. He wrote two more critiques on Asan's works, Chinthavistayaaya Seetha, Oru Padanam and Duravastha, Oru Padanam. He published a book on Narayana Guru, with the same name, and commentaries on Guru's Darsanamala and Atmopadeshashathakam. He also translated Brhadaranyaka Upanisad into English, which has the original text in transliteration as well as English translation and published critiques on the Bhagavat Gita, Saundaryalahari of Sankaracharya and Marxism. Wandering by Hermann Hesse was another work translated by Yati which was published under the title, Deshadanam. His autobiography, Love and Blessings, is a detailed narrative of his life and includes anecdotes and his letters.

Selected bibliography

Works in Malayalam

Works in English 
 
 
In the Stream of Consciousness, East-West University (1976) 
 
 
 
 
 
 
 
 
 
Psychology of Darsana Mala, DK Print World (2004) 
 
Living the Science of Harmonious Union (Patanjali’s Yoga Shastra), DK Print World (2009) 
That Alone, the Core of Wisdom, DK Print World (2013)

See also 

 Muloor S.Padmanabha Panicker
 List of Malayalam-language authors

References

Further reading

External links 
 
 
 

1999 deaths
Indian male poets
Yoga scholars
1924 births
Vedanta
Spiritual practice
University College Thiruvananthapuram alumni
Indian Hindu missionaries
20th-century Indian philosophers
People from Pathanamthitta district
20th-century Hindu philosophers and theologians
20th-century Indian writers
Indian non-fiction writers
Recipients of the Kerala Sahitya Akademi Award
20th-century non-fiction writers
Male non-fiction writers